Bees on the Boat Deck is a 1936 comedy drama play by the British writer J.B. Priestley.

It ran for 37 performances at the Lyric Theatre in London's West End. The cast included Laurence Olivier, Ralph Richardson, Rene Ray and Raymond Huntley.

In 1939 the play was made into a television film by the BBC, starring Richardson, James Mason, John Laurie and Meriel Forbes.

References

Bibliography
 Gindin, James. British Fiction in the 1930s: The Dispiriting Decade. Springer, 2016.
 Wearing, J.P. The London Stage 1930-1939: A Calendar of Productions, Performers, and Personnel.  Rowman & Littlefield, 2014.

1936 plays
Plays by J. B. Priestley
British comedy films
West End plays